The canton of Calais-1 is an administrative division of the Pas-de-Calais department, in northern France. It was created at the French canton reorganisation which came into effect in March 2015. Its seat is in Calais.

It consists of the following communes: 

Bonningues-lès-Calais
Calais (partly)
Coquelles 
Escalles
Fréthun
Hames-Boucres
Nielles-lès-Calais
Peuplingues
Pihen-lès-Guînes
Saint-Tricat
Sangatte

References

Cantons of Pas-de-Calais